Calvin Grant Harrison (born 29 April 1998) is a South African-born English cricketer.

Harrison was born at Durban and was educated in England at King's College, Taunton. From King's he went up to Oxford Brookes University. While studying at Oxford Brookes, he made two appearances in first-class cricket for Oxford MCCU in 2019, playing against Middlesex and Hampshire. He scored 65 runs in his two matches, with a high score of 37 not out. With his leg break and googly bowling, he took 3 wickets with best figures of 1 for 30. He made his Twenty20 debut on 10 September 2020, for Hampshire in the 2020 t20 Blast.

On 8 June 2021, Harrison signed for Nottinghamshire on a three-month contract. In April 2022, he was bought by the Manchester Originals for the 2022 season of The Hundred.

Notes

References

External links

1998 births
Living people
Cricketers from Durban
South African emigrants to the United Kingdom
People educated at King's College, Taunton
Alumni of Oxford Brookes University
English cricketers
Oxford MCCU cricketers
Hampshire cricketers
Manchester Originals cricketers
Nottinghamshire cricketers